Lucas Concistre (born 11 May 1984) was an Argentinian football forward who last played for Everton.

Career
He won promotion to the Argentine Primera División with Olimpo during the 2009–10 season of the Primera B Nacional.

External links
Statistics at BDFA

1984 births
Living people
Association football forwards
Argentine footballers
Argentine expatriate footballers
Defensores de Belgrano footballers
Club Atlético Platense footballers
Instituto footballers
Olimpo footballers
Anorthosis Famagusta F.C. players
Ñublense footballers
C.S.D. Independiente del Valle footballers
Club Atlético Sarmiento footballers
Chacarita Juniors footballers
C.S.D. Municipal players
Santiago Morning footballers
Everton de Viña del Mar footballers
Primera B de Chile players
Chilean Primera División players
Argentine Primera División players
Cypriot First Division players
Expatriate footballers in Chile
Expatriate footballers in Cyprus
Expatriate footballers in Ecuador
People from Quilmes
Sportspeople from Buenos Aires Province